is a Buddhist temple, one of fourteen autonomous branches of the Rinzai school of Japanese Zen. It is located in Kita-ku, Kyoto, Japan.

History
Daitoku-ji originated as a small monastery founded in 1315 or 1319 by the monk , who is known by the title Daitō Kokushi ("National Teacher of the Great Lamp") given by Emperor Go-Daigo. In 1325, the monastery was converted into a supplication hall for the imperial court at the request of the retired Emperor Hanazono. The dedication ceremony for the imperial supplication hall, with its newly added dharma hall and abbot's living quarters, was held in 1326, and this is generally recognized as the true founding of the temple.

Like many other temples in Kyoto during that time, the temple's buildings were destroyed by fire. In 1474, which was when Kyoto was the scene of the Ōnin War, Emperor Go-Tsuchimikado designated Ikkyū Sōjun as the head priest. With the help of merchants of the city of Sakai, Ikkyū contributed significantly to the temple's rehabilitation.

From its earliest days, the temple experienced alternating periods of fortune and decline. This can be attributed to the rivalries and conflicts between Daitoku-ji and other well-known Zen temples, as well as between Daitoku-ji and the political authorities.

Daitoku-ji became particularly important from the sixteenth century, when it was predominantly supported by members of the military establishment, who sponsored the building of subsidiary temples as prayers for their ancestors or in preparation for their own demise.
In 1582, Toyotomi Hideyoshi buried his predecessor, Oda Nobunaga, at Daitoku-ji. He also contributed land and built the Sōken-in.

Around this period in history, Daitoku-ji became closely linked to the master of the Japanese tea ceremony, Sen no Rikyū, and consequently to the realm of the Japanese tea ceremony. After the era of Sen no Rikyū, another famous figure in the history of the Japanese tea ceremony who left his mark at this temple was Kobori Enshū.

Buildings
There are several buildings in the complex:

Sanmon (Mountain Gate)
Butsuden (Buddha Hall)
Hattō (Dharma Hall)
Hōjō (Abbot's Quarters)
Yokushitsu (Bath House)
Kyōzō (Sutra Library)

Treasures

Daitoku-ji is home to some works by the 13th-century Chinese artist-monk Mu Qi: 
 the acclaimed painting Six Persimmons (housed in Ryūkō-in, the painting is hardly ever put on display)
 the

Sub-temples

Shichidō garan
The garan (compound):

Tatchū
The :

See also
 Goto Zuigan
 Kobori Nanrei Sohaku
 For an explanation of terms concerning Japanese Buddhism, Japanese Buddhist art, and Japanese Buddhist temple architecture, see the Glossary of Japanese Buddhism.
List of National Treasures of Japan (residences)
List of National Treasures of Japan (temples)
 List of National Treasures of Japan (ancient documents)
List of National Treasures of Japan (paintings)
List of National Treasures of Japan (writings)

References

Further reading

External links
  Daitoku-ji - halls, sub-temples
 Photos of Daitoku-ji and its sub-temples

 
Daitoku-ji temples
Zen gardens